South Thomaston is a town in Knox County, Maine, United States. The population was 1,511 at the 2020 census. A fishing and resort area, the town includes the village of Spruce Head, Maine.

History

Abenaki Indians called it Wessaweskeag, meaning "tidal creek" or "salt creek," a reference to what is now known as the Weskeag River. Thomas Lefebvre from Quebec, Canada owned a huge tract of land at the Weskeag River, where his stay began in 1704. He built a large gristmill, with a house on the shoreline. Although he would eventually return to Quebec, the area retained his name—Thomas' Town. But the adjacent St. George River was the uneasy dividing line between land controlled by New England and New France. Permanent settlement would be delayed by the French and Indian Wars, which ended with the 1763 Treaty of Paris.

In 1767, Wessaweskeag was settled by Elisha Snow, who built a sawmill operated by tidal power. In 1773, Joseph Coombs arrived and built another sawmill nearby, and together they built a gristmill. The village of South Thomaston grew around the mills, which would include three granite polishing machines to process stone cut from the town's numerous quarries. On July 28, 1848, South Thomaston was set off from Thomaston and incorporated as a separate town. Owl's Head would be set off from South Thomaston on July 9, 1921.  Joseph Baum and Flora Baum owned and operated the Baum's Market,  now known as the Keag Store.  Flora Baum was the Postmistress,  appointed by President Woodrow Wilson.  The Baum's had four children:  Alice,  Dorothy,  Joan and Joseph Baum, Jr. (Bud).  For many years Bud was on the Board of Selectmen and was the Fire Chief.
Gilford Butler was a local attorney and chairman of the school board.  Gilford Bulter and his sister Lula Butler lived in what is now known as the Geag Inn,  next to the present U. S. Post Office.  Gilford was an attorney in nearby Rockland.  Gilford left a large amount of his estate to the town in order to build a local elementary school,  with the stipulation that the school bear his name.

Geography
South Thomaston is located on the Weskeag River inlet.

Demographics

The median income for a household in the town was $43,594, and the median income for a family was $55,000. Males had a median income of $38,500 versus $33,125 for females. The per capita income for the town was $24,522.  About 6.7% of families and 9.1% of the population were below the poverty line, including 12.3% of those under age 18 and 7.3% of those age 65 or over. Of the 832 people in the labor force only 25 were unemployed as of the 2010 census making the town's unemployment rate 2.9%.

2010 census
As of the census of 2010, there were 1,558 people, 674 households, and 442 families residing in the town. The racial makeup of the town was 96.8% White, 0.3% African American, 0.4% Native American, 0.8% Asian, 0.1% from other races, and 1.7% from two or more races. Hispanic or Latino of any race were 0.6% of the population.

There were 674 households, of which 25.1% had children under the age of 18 living with them, 52.8% were married couples living together, 7.9% had a female householder with no husband present, 4.9% had a male householder with no wife present, and 34.4% were non-families. 27.3% of all households were made up of individuals, and 11.6% had someone living alone who was 65 years of age or older. The average household size was 2.31 and the average family size was 2.79.

The median age in the town was 47.1 years. 19.6% of residents were under the age of 18; 6.1% were between the ages of 18 and 24; 21.3% were from 25 to 44; 32.5% were from 45 to 64; and 20.5% were 65 years of age or older. The gender makeup of the town was 50.3% male and 49.7% female.

Site of interest
 Wessaweskeag Historical Society

References

External links
 Town of South Thomaston, Maine
 South Thomaston Public Library
 Maine Genealogy: South Thomaston, Knox County, Maine

Towns in Knox County, Maine
Towns in Maine
Populated coastal places in Maine